Sounds of the Loop is the tenth studio album by British-Irish singer-songwriter Gilbert O'Sullivan, released in November 1991 (Japan) and in April 1993 (UK). Union Square Music re-released it in April 2013 on the Salvo label as part of the Gilbert O'Sullivan - A Singer and His Songs collection.

Track listing 
All songs written by Gilbert O'Sullivan.
 "Are You Happy?" - 3:30
 "Not That It Bothers Me" - 3:17
 "Sometimes" - 4:08
 "It's Easy to See When You're Blind" - 4:01
 "Having Said That" - 4:00
 "Can't Think Straight" (duet with Peggy Lee) - 4:05
 "The Best Love I Never Had" - 3:42
 "Divorce Irish Style" - 4:14
 "Came and Went" - 3:45
 "I'm Not Too Young" - 4:06
 "I Can Give You" - 3:41

Bonus tracks on the 2013 remaster
 "Can't Think Straight" (Japanese version - duet with Takao Kisugi) - 4:05
 "Can't Think Straight" (Spanish version - duet with Silvia Tortosa) - 4:05
 "What a Way (To Show I Love You)" (Words by Gilbert O'Sullivan, Music by Takao Kisugi) (from Japanese releases of Sounds of the Loop) - 4:13

Personnel
 Gilbert O'Sullivan - vocals, piano, rhythm keyboards

Additional personnel
 Roly Kerridge - drums, programming, percussion
 Bob Skeat - bass
 Mick Parker - keyboards, programming, accordion
 Geoff Whitehorn - lead and rhythm guitars

References
 Sounds of the Loop, CD booklet, 2013

External links 
Official Gilbert O'Sullivan page

1991 albums
Gilbert O'Sullivan albums